The 2010 Promotional League Final was the Final event of the 2010 FEI Nations Cup Promotional League and the second Promotional League Final ever. It was held in Barcelona, Catalonia (Spain) on September 19, 2010 at 5:00 pm during the 2010 CSIO Barcelona. A €90,000 purse was offered at this CSIO 5* competition, with each of the eight competing teams receiving a share.

Qualified and competing teams 
The qualified teams of the 2010 Promotional League Final are:
 from Europe and other regions without own Promotional League (The second-placed to seventh-placed nations of the Promotional League Europe):
 
 
 
 
 
 
 from America (the best-placed nation of the Promotional League North and South America):
 
 from the Middle East (the best-placed nation of the Promotional League Middle East):
 

The teams of Australia, Greece and the United Arab Emirates didn't start in the 2010 Promotional League Final. Because they didn't start,  (eight-placed nation of the Promotional League Europe) have the chance to start in the final.

Also  as host nation start in the 2010 Promotional League Final (Spain have no chance to move up to the 2011 Meydan FEI Nations Cup).

Result 
The best-placed team of this competition, Denmark, move into the 2011 Meydan FEI Nations Cup.

References 
 rules Meydan FEI Nations Cup and FEI Nations Cup Promotional Leagues 2010/2011

External links 
 Time table CSIO Barcelona 2010
 results CSIO Barcelona 2010

2010 in show jumping
Equestrian sports competitions in Spain
Meydan FEI Nations Cup
2010 in Spanish sport